Ausktribosphenos is an extinct genus of mammals from Early Cretaceous of Australia. The only recorded species, Ausktribosphenos nyktos, was found on Flat Rocks, Victoria.

References

Cretaceous mammals of Australia
Australosphenida
Fossil taxa described in 1997
Prehistoric mammal genera